Chanodichthys dabryi, the humpback or lake skygazer, is a species of ray-finned fish in the genus Chanodichthys. This freshwater cyprinid is found in China and Russia where it ranges from the Amur River to the Yangtze. It is fished, but remains common. As presently defined, it is likely species complex.

Etymology
Named in honor of Pierre Dabry de Thiersant (1826-1898), fish culturist, French counsel to China, and student of Chinese fishes, who sent specimens to the Muséum d’Histoire naturelle de Paris.

References 

Chanodichthys
Taxa named by Pieter Bleeker
Fish described in 1871